Jaroslav Šťastný (6 April 1936 – 28 February 2004) was a Czech gymnast. He competed in eight events at the 1960 Summer Olympics. He died on 28 February 2004, at the age of 67.

References

External links
 

1936 births
2004 deaths
Czech male artistic gymnasts
Olympic gymnasts of Czechoslovakia
Gymnasts at the 1960 Summer Olympics